Judge Boynton may refer to:

Charles Albert Boynton (1867–1954), judge of the United States District Court for the Western District of Texas
Thomas Jefferson Boynton (1838–1871), judge of the United States District Court for the Southern District of Florida